Phellinus ferreus is a plant pathogen infecting stone fruit trees.

References

External links 
 Index Fungorum
 USDA ARS Fungal Database

Fungal tree pathogens and diseases
Stone fruit tree diseases
Phellinus
Fungi of Europe
Fungi described in 1928